George Cafego (August 29, 1915 – February 9, 1998) was an American football player and coach of football and baseball.  He played college football at the University of Tennessee, earning varsity letters 1937 - 1939, and professionally in the National Football League (NFL) with the Brooklyn Dodgers, Washington Redskins, Boston Yanks.  He served as the head baseball coach at the University of Wyoming in 1950 and at his alma mater, Tennessee, from 1958 to 1962.  Cafego was inducted into the College Football Hall of Fame as a player in 1969.

High school and collegiate career
Born in rural Whipple, West Virginia to John Cafego and Mary (Rednock) Cafego, Cafego attended Oak Hill High School in nearby Oak Hill.  He went to the University of Tennessee as a halfback under coach Robert Neyland.  While there, he earned varsity letters 1937 - 1939 and compiled 2,139 total yards and two All-American team selections.  He was also a finalist for the Heisman Memorial Trophy.  In addition to running and passing the ball, Cafego also served as punter and kickoff returner, excelling at both.  At Tennessee his nickname was "Bad News". As a sophomore, his first year on the varsity, he already showed signs of success, catching "many an expert eye."

Professional career
Cafego was drafted as the number one overall pick in 1940 NFL draft by the Chicago Cardinals. He eventually played for the Brooklyn Dodgers. After playing one season, his career was interrupted by a brief stint of Army service in World War II era. During this time he appeared in several games for the Newport News Builders of the Dixie League. Returning to the Dodgers in 1943, he was traded to the Washington Redskins after five unspectacular games. For the 1944 and 1945 seasons, Cafego played for the Boston Yanks before retiring.

Coaching career
After his playing career was over, Cafego served as an assistant coach at Wyoming, Furman, Arkansas, and 30 years at his alma mater, Tennessee, serving under a total of six different head coaches during his UT coaching career.  He was also the head coach of Tennessee Volunteers baseball from 1958 to 1962.  He retired from coaching following the 1984 season.

Death
Cafego died in Knoxville, Tennessee at the age of 82 and was buried in Fayette County, West Virginia.

References

External links

 
 
 

1915 births
1998 deaths
All-American college football players
American football fullbacks
American football halfbacks
American football quarterbacks
Arkansas Razorbacks football coaches
Boston Yanks players
Brooklyn Dodgers (NFL) players
College Football Hall of Fame inductees
Furman Paladins football coaches
National Football League first-overall draft picks
People from Fayette County, West Virginia
Tennessee Volunteers baseball coaches
Tennessee Volunteers football coaches
Tennessee Volunteers football players
Washington Redskins players
Wyoming Cowboys baseball coaches
Wyoming Cowboys football coaches
Players of American football from West Virginia
United States Army soldiers
United States Army personnel of World War II